This is a list of the longest High School boys' basketball winning streaks, regardless of division, by state.

References 

Basketball-related lists